Mooi! Weer De Leeuw (Dutch: "Great! De Leeuw Again") was a popular Dutch television show hosted by comedian Paul de Leeuw, that ran from 2005 to 2009. The programme was produced by VARA, one of the contributors to the Dutch public broadcasting group Netherlands Public Broadcasting.

Broadcast weekly on Saturday evenings, the programme consisted of surprising audience members by fulfilling wishes that had been sent in by their family or friends, celebrity interviews and variety performances. The show had a distinctive, quirky feel based upon the personal comedy and tastes of De Leeuw, including performances by Arijan van Bavel portraying his character "Adje". The show had its own small band, led by Cor Bakker, and also featured national and international acts, such as Son de Sol, Kylie Minogue, Lionel Richie, Robbie Williams, Lady Gaga and Adele, who usually performed live in the show in addition to being interviewed. In most cases these acts were supported by the show's house band.

Mooi! Weer De Leeuw is probably best known internationally for its notorious appearance in the 2006 Eurovision Song Contest, where De Leeuw gave the results of the Dutch televote from the programme's studio (the show was usually broadcast during the time period occupied by Eurovision). De Leeuw, who is openly homosexual, flirted with the male presenter Sakis Rouvas and gave out his supposed mobile phone number. The exchange was broadcast around the world to hundreds of millions of viewers and earned De Leeuw criticism from several of the event's commentators, some of whom refused to translate it.

The programme was broadcast in the Netherlands on Nederland 1 and was simulcast globally on the international Dutch-language channel BVN.

After the show's conclusion in 2009, De Leeuw went on presenting a new show, Lieve Paul (Dear Paul), which has a similar concept, but focuses on answering audience members' questions instead of fulfilling their wishes.

References 

Dutch television talk shows
2005 Dutch television series debuts
2009 Dutch television series endings
NPO 1 original programming